Olashore International school is a private co-educational boarding secondary school located in Osun State, Nigeria. The School was founded by the late Oba Olashore in 1994.

History 
Olashore International School became operational on January 9, 1994, and started with 100 year 7 students.

The school was founded by Oba Oladele Olashore CON in his hometown of Iloko, Nigeria and named after himself.  Together with the founding Principal, Dr. D. F. Burgess they influenced the early years of the school greatly.

Olashore International School is a learning community committed to academic excellence, nurturing each child to their full potential in a safe and serene environment, developing leaders for the dynamic global society in the 21st century.

20 year anniversary
Olashore International School recently celebrated 20 years of establishment in Lagos.

See also
 British International School Lagos

References 

Secondary schools in Osun State
1994 establishments in Nigeria
Educational institutions established in 1994